Cathlia Mary Ward (born May 14, 1994) is a Canadian curler. She currently plays third on Team Amélie Blais.

Career

Juniors
Ward's first national level event was at the 2013 Canadian Junior Curling Championships as third for Jessica Daigle. There, her team went 4–6 threw the round robin and championship pool, missing the playoffs. She returned the following year with the same team as in 2013 and they once again went 4–6. She was the alternate for Corryn Brown at the 2013 World Junior Curling Championships where the team went 3–6.

Women's
Out of juniors, Ward joined the Melissa Adams rink at second. They competed in local World Curling Tour events with their best finish at the WFG Jim Sullivan Curling Classic where they won the title. At the 2016 New Brunswick Scotties Tournament of Hearts, the team made it all the way to the final where they just came up short to Team Robichaud.

The following season, the Adams rink returned to the provincial championship. After going 4–2 in the round robin, the team won the tiebreaker and the semi-final to advance to the final. There, they scored four points in the sixth end en route to a 9–6 win. It was just Ward's second provincial appearance. At the Hearts, the team would have to win the pre-qualifying event to qualify for the main draw. After going 3–0 in the round robin portion, they came up short in the final against Northwest Territories Kerry Galusha.

Adams left the team after the season to join the Robichaud rink and Jillian Babin joined the team at second. At provincials, the team lost in the semifinal to Sarah Mallais.

Ward left the Armstrong team after the season and made a new team curling out of Newfoundland and Labrador. The team played in the 2019 Newfoundland and Labrador Scotties Tournament of Hearts where they lost the final to Kelli Sharpe.

The following season, she joined the Sarah Mallais rink at third. They missed the playoffs in their first event, the Steele Cup Cash. At the 2020 New Brunswick Scotties Tournament of Hearts, they missed the playoffs with a 2–3 record.

Teams

References

External links

Canadian women curlers
Curlers from New Brunswick
Living people
1994 births
Sportspeople from Fredericton